There Are No False Undertakings is a Canadian comedy film, directed by Olivier Godin and released in 2020.

The film stars Tatiana Zinga Botao as Marie-Cobra Tremblay, a writer who is working on a screenplay she hopes that Denzel Washington will star in; however, her work is complicated by the disapproval of her ex-husband Rosaire (François-Simon Poirier) and her best friend Mélusine (Leslie Mavangui), Washington's (Fayolle Jean) lack of interest in the project as he is more focused on the goal of getting cast as Angel in a new Buffy the Vampire Slayer reboot, and the discouraging feedback of professional screenwriter Croquette (Éric K. Boulianne).

The film's cast also includes Florence Blain Mbaye, Alexis Martin, Ève Duranceau, Schelby Jean-Baptiste and Jean-Marc Dalpé.

The film premiered on October 7, 2020 at the Festival du nouveau cinéma.

Critical response
Alex Rose of Cult MTL reviewed the film positively, writing that it "goes in every direction at once, a dialogue-dense comedy of manners that subscribes to no particular sense of genre or comedic timing. Though somewhat of a meta-deconstruction of the process of writing a film (with copious jabs at the wonderfulness of grants) and of the invisible borders of intellectualism (prompting the immortal line “Pasolini, y’est-tu sur Netflix?!”), it’s also just fucking weird from top to bottom. It’s rare to see a film that’s so playful and yet so comfortable with alienating the majority of people who might lay eyes on it, which puts it in its own category on the Quebec cinematic landscape." He additionally noted that "it's also extremely rare to see this many people of colour in a Quebec movie that isn’t about street gangs or refugees."

For Screen Anarchy, Shelagh Rowan-Legg wrote that "At nearly two hours, it could have probably trimmed its time a bit; absurdism can get tiring when the audience has to keep up with all the complicated connections, and perhaps a few of the vignettes didn't quite find their feet. Yet overall, There Are No False Undertakings is a bizarre journey into the oddities of a collective imagination, one in which you will likely find your own thoughts (ones you thought to never speak aloud) reflected in delightful characters and their deadpan yet whimsical understakings [sic]."

References

External links

2020 films
2020 comedy films
Canadian comedy films
Quebec films
Films set in Quebec
Films shot in Quebec
Black Canadian films
2020s French-language films
French-language Canadian films
2020s Canadian films